Krishna Upadhyay (also Srikrishna or Shrikrishna) (born 1945) is a Nepalese entrepreneur and economist.

Career
Upadhyay worked with the Agriculture Development Bank for 28 years, leaving in 1990. From 1991 to 1994, he served as a member of the National planning Commission and was in charge of the Poverty Alleviation Programme.

In 1991, he was the founder of the organization SAPPROS, Support Activities for Poor Producers of Nepal. His notable books are Pro-Poor Growth and Governance in South Asia–Decentralization and Participatory Development, and Economic Democracy through Pro-Poor Growth.

In 2010, he was recognized for his work in alleviating poverty as a winner of the Right Livelihood Award. Asked if there was a common formula for bringing villages out of poverty, he advocated a "participatory approach and involving people in the planning, design, execution and management of small projects in rural areas [that] will enhance their capacity and increase impact and sustainability."

Selected publications

Awards
Right Livelihood Award, 2010

References

1945 births
Living people
Nepalese economists